The 1921 Washington and Lee Generals football team represented Washington and Lee University during the 1921 college football season. The Generals competed in the South Atlantic Intercollegiate Athletic Association (SAIAA) and were coached by W. C. Raftery in his fifth year as head coach, compiling a 6–3 record (2–0 SAIAA) and claiming the SAIAA title. The team outscored its opponents 172 to 74.

Schedule

References

Washington and Lee
Washington and Lee Generals football seasons
South Atlantic Intercollegiate Athletic Association football champion seasons
Washington and Lee Generals football